Curse of the Puppet Master is a 1998 direct-to-video horror film written by Benjamin Carr and David Schmoeller, and directed by David DeCoteau. The sixth film in the Puppet Master franchise, it stars George Peck as scientist Dr. Magrew, who experiments with transforming humans into puppets.

While Puppet Master 5 was intended to be the final installment four years earlier, financial success and fan demand spawned Curse (which borrows quite heavily from the 1973 eco-horror film Sssssss), serving as a standalone sequel that promptly revived the series, which has been ongoing since.

Plot
The film begins at The House of Marvels, a doll museum, where Dr. Magrew (George Peck), stuffs something into a crate, before driving into the woods and setting it on fire. The next morning, Magrew's daughter Jane (Emily Harrison), who has just returned home from college, asks her father about his assistant Matt. He tells her that Matt left because his father was ill. Driving into town, Magrew and Jane interrupt bully Joey Carp (Michael D. Guerin) harassing Robert Winsley (Josh Green) at a gas station. Jane finds a statue that Robert was carving, and Magrew offers Robert a job helping him with the Marvel show, which Robert accepts.

Returning home, they introduce Robert to Toulon's puppets, which are alive. Magrew says he tried to make a living puppet, but unsuccessfully, and asks Robert to help him carve the puppet. The next day, during the show, Sheriff Garvey (Robert Donavan) and Deputy Wayburn (Jason-Shane Scott) tell Magrew that Matt is missing, and Magrew tells them he hasn’t seen him. Magrew gives Robert the blueprints for the puppet, instructing him to “put your soul into it". Robert begins carving and works non-stop.

One night, Robert has a nightmare that his legs have turned to wood. Later, Jane tries to distract him while working, causing him to cut himself. They flirt and end up kissing. That night, Robert has another nightmare that his entire body is wooden from the neck down. The next day, Jane and Robert drive to the woods, where they find the box that Magrew burnt at the beginning of the film.

Robert finds a carved wooden hand in the box. Meanwhile Jane walks off and encounters Joey and his friends, who sexually harass her. Robert arrives and defends Jane, but Joey threatens to rape her. Robert attacks Joey, but Jane pulls him away and they return to the house. Robert confesses that he felt a strange feeling while he was choking Joey, and Magrew tells him it was his violent inner self. Robert expresses fear that this self will appear again.

That night, Joey comes to the "House of Marvels" to beat Robert up, and decides to try again to rape Jane. Jane tells him to leave, and the doll Pinhead attacks Joey and chokes him, but Joey pulls him off and damages him. When Magrew and Robert arrive, Joey escapes. Magrew takes Blade and Tunneler to Joey's house and they kill him. Back at the house, Robert shows Jane that he fixed Pinhead, and they kiss. Returning, Magrew sees Robert coming out of Jane's room, and confronts her, becoming angry when she says she loves Robert, before leaving. Five days later, Jane finds Robert very sick. She asks her father to call the doctor, but he only pretends to. He then tricks Jane into leaving on a fool’s errand while he waits for the non-existent doctor to arrive. A medical examiner (William Knight) believes that Joey's death was intentional. Sheriff Garvey questions Joey's friend Art (Marc Newburger), who mentions seeing Joey with Jane in the woods. Sheriff Garvey and Deputy Wayburn go to question Magrew at the House of Marvels, but they are killed by the dolls as Magrew watches, laughing.

Jane discovers that her father has not ordered any new dolls for six months, and returns to the woods to examine the burned box. The puppet inside speaks to her in Matt’s voice. She realizes she has to save Robert, and returns to the House. At the house, Magrew puts Robert's soul into the puppet Tank, but the puppets attack him, angry that he killed Robert. Jane arrives to find her father bleeding to death, pointing at Tank, saying "I did it". Suddenly, the Tank puppet points its arm at Magrew and shoots him dead with a bolt of electricity. The film ends with Magrew screaming before death, and Jane screaming in horrified terror.

Cast
 George Peck as Dr. Magrew
 Emily Harrison as Jane Magrew
 Josh Green as Robert 'Tank' Winsley
 Michael D. Guerin Joey Carp
 Michael Sollenberger as Station Owner
 Marc Newburger as Art Cooney
 Scott Boyer as Larry
 Jason Dean Booher as Pogo
 Robert Donavan as Sheriff Garvey
 Jason-Shane Scott as Deputy Wayburn
 William Knight as Medical Examiner
 Patrick Thomas as Shipping Agent
 Ariauna Albright as Operator's Voice
 J.R. Bookwalter as Tommy Berke's Voice

Featured puppets
 Blade
 Pinhead
 Leech Woman
 Jester
 Tunneler
 Torch (Stock Footage only)
 Six-Shooter
 Matt (Freak)
 Tank
 Dummy

References

External links
 
 
 Curse of the Puppet Master at Rotten Tomatoes

American supernatural horror films
1998 films
Full Moon Features films
Puppet films
Puppet Master (film series)
American sequel films
Direct-to-video sequel films
1998 horror films
Films directed by David DeCoteau
1990s English-language films
1990s American films